Pisana, an Italian feminine adjective referring to Pisa, may refer to:

 Pisana (Rome), an administrative subdivision of Rome
 Pisana Conaro (died 1769), Dogaressa of Venice
 Carta Pisana, a map made at the end of the 13th century found in Pisa, hence its name
 Cetonia aurata pisana, a subspecies of the rose chafer
 Mucca Pisana, a breed of cattle from Tuscany, in central Italy
 Rocca Pisana, a sixteenth-century villa for the Pisani family
 Theba pisana, a snail

See also 
 Pisano (disambiguation)
 Pisani (disambiguation)